James Sullivan Wiley (January 22, 1808 – December 21, 1891) was a U.S. Representative from Maine.

Life
Born in Mercer, Massachusetts (now in Maine), Wiley moved to Bethel, Maine, in 1826 then attended Gould Academy and graduated from Colby College, Waterville, Maine, in 1836.
He moved to Dover, Maine, and was an instructor at the Foxcroft Academy.
He studied law and was admitted to the Piscataquis County bar in 1839 and commenced practice in Dover.

Wiley was elected as a Democrat to the Thirtieth Congress (March 4, 1847 – March 3, 1849).
He resumed the practice of law in Dover.
He moved to Fryeburg, Maine, in 1889 and continued the practice of law until his death in that town on December 21, 1891.
He was interred in Smart Hill Cemetery.

Wiley's 1849 home in Dover-Foxcroft is listed on the National Register of Historic Places.

References

Speech of Hon. James S. Wiley, of Maine, on the acquisition of territory

1808 births
1891 deaths
Colby College alumni
People from Fryeburg, Maine
People from Dover-Foxcroft, Maine
People from Mercer, Maine
Maine lawyers
Democratic Party members of the United States House of Representatives from Maine
19th-century American politicians
People from Bethel, Maine
19th-century American lawyers